Oedaspis fissa is a species of tephritid or fruit flies in the genus Oedaspis of the family Tephritidae.

Distribution
Spain.

References

Tephritinae
Insects described in 1862
Diptera of Europe